Stanley Crawford (born 1937) is an American writer and farmer. His novels include, among others, Travel Notes (1967), The Log of the S.S. The Mrs Unguentine (1972), Some Instructions (1978), and Petroleum Man (2005). His nonfiction works include A Garlic Testament (1992), a biography of life on his farm in Dixon, New Mexico. Mayordomo: Chronicle of an Acequia in Northern New Mexico (1988) was the winner of the 1988 Western States Book Award for Creative Non-fiction.

Biography 
Crawford was born in 1937 and was educated at the University of Chicago and the Sorbonne. He moved to Dixon, New Mexico in 1970, where he owns El Bosque, a garlic farm, and served for a time as the President of the Santa Fe Area Farmers' Market.

Works 
 
Reissued by Penguin, 2005. .
 
Reissued by Calamari Press, 2014. .
 
 
 
Reissued by University of New Mexico Press, 1993. .

References

Further reading

Interviews

Reviews
Gascoyne

Travel Notes

Petroleum Man

External links

1937 births
Living people
American male novelists
People from Rio Arriba County, New Mexico
Writers from New Mexico
20th-century American novelists
21st-century American novelists
American male essayists
20th-century American essayists
21st-century American essayists
20th-century American male writers
21st-century American male writers